Hypomolis venedictoffae is a moth of the family Erebidae. It was described by Hervé de Toulgoët in 1977. It is found in Ecuador.

References

 

Arctiini
Moths described in 1977